Lawrence W. Stirling is a former US Army Infantry Major; a former Member of the San Diego City Council; a former four-term member of the California State Assembly; a former member of the California State Senate; a former Municipal Court Judge and now a Retired San Diego County Superior Court Judge.

Upon retirement from the bench, Stirling became the Senior Partner in the Adams-Stirling Law Firm based in Los Angeles and is admitted to practice before both the California and United States Supreme Courts.

While serving as a member of the California State Assembly, Stirling authored the Davis-Stirling Common Interest Development Act which governs condominium, cooperative, and planned unit development communities in California.

He also enacted over 200 pieces of legislation.

Stirling is also the author of three books: Asked and Answered, a book on court-room evidence; Leading at a Higher Level, a book on the history of San Diego City; The Noblest Motive, a text book of public administration. He is also the author of Making Sense of It, a column that can be found in the San Diego Daily Transcript Newspaper Archives.

References

20th-century American politicians
21st-century American judges
Members of the California State Assembly
California state senators
Year of birth missing (living people)
Living people
San Diego City Council members
California state court judges